"I've Got No Strings" (also known as "I Got No Strings") is a song from Walt Disney's animated film Pinocchio (1940), sung by Dickie Jones as Pinocchio. The music was written by Leigh Harline, the lyrics were written by Ned Washington. The recording by Jones was released by Victor Records as catalog number 26479A (in United States) and by EMI on the His Master's Voice label as catalog number BD 822.

The song was also featured in the 2000 television film Geppetto sung by Seth Adkins, and a 2022 live-action remake, in which it was sung by Benjamin Evan Ainsworth as Pinocchio.

The song were featured in the Marvel film Avengers: Age of Ultron, which made 1.4 billion dollars at the box office.

References

1940 songs
Disney songs
Songs based on fairy tales
Songs written for animated films
Songs with lyrics by Ned Washington
Barbra Streisand songs
Songs with music by Leigh Harline
Pinocchio (1940 film)
Music published by Bourne Co. Music Publishers